Eric Chafe (born 1946) is an American musicologist  specializing in the music of Claudio Monteverdi, Heinrich Biber, Johann Sebastian Bach and Richard Wagner.

Chafe holds a PhD in musicology from the University of Toronto. He teaches at Brandeis University, near Boston.

Bibliography 
 
 Tonal Allegory in the Vocal Music of J.S. Bach, University of California Press, 1991
 
 
 
 Bach's Johannine Theology: The 'St. John Passion' and the Cantatas for Spring 1725, New York, Oxford University Press, 2014
 Tears into Wine: J. S. Bach's Cantata 21 in its Musical and Theological Contexts, New York, Oxford University Press, 2015

References

External links 
 Presentation on brandeis.edu
 Review of Eric Chafe. Analyzing Bach Cantatas.

1946 births
Living people
American musicologists
Brandeis University alumni
University of Toronto alumni